Iuliana Nucu (born October 4, 1980 in Constanța) is a retired female volleyball player from Romania.

Clubs
  Tomis Constanța (1996–1999)
  CSU Metal Galați (1999–2003)
  Asystel Novara (2003–2006)
  Sassuolo Volley (2006–2009)
  Tiboni Urbino (2009–2010)
  Volley Bergamo (2010–2012)
  Crema Volley (2012–2013)
  Dinamo Bucarest (2013)

Awards

Clubs
Italian Championship: 1 time (2011);
Italian Cup: 1 time (2004);
Italian Supercup: 3 times (2003, 2005, 2011);
Challenge Cup: 1 time (2006).

References

External links
 Profile at legavolleyfemminile.it 

1980 births
Living people
Sportspeople from Constanța
Romanian women's volleyball players
Romanian expatriates in Italy
Expatriate volleyball players in Italy